Ladybug & Cat Noir: The Movie is an upcoming French 3D computer-animated musical superhero film written and directed by Jeremy Zag. It is an adaptation of the animated television series Miraculous: Tales of Ladybug & Cat Noir, and follows two Parisian teenagers, Marinette Dupain-Cheng and Adrien Agreste, who transform into the superheroes Ladybug and Cat Noir, respectively, to protect the city from supervillains.

Jeremy Zag first announced a theatrical adaptation in 2018. Production started in 2019, with Zag confirming that the plot will explore the origins of the franchise. It is the second theatrical film based on a TF1's TFOU animated series after the 2009 film Totally Spies! The Movie.

Ladybug & Cat Noir: The Movie is scheduled to be released in France on July 5, 2023 by SND.

Voice cast

Original cast
 Anouck Hautbois as Marinette Dupain-Cheng / Ladybug
 Benjamin Bollen as Adrien Agreste / Cat Noir

English cast

 Cristina Vee as Marinette Dupain-Cheng / Ladybug
 Bryce Papenbrook as Adrien Agreste / Cat Noir
 Mela Lee as Tikki
 Max Mittelman as Plagg
 Keith Silverstein as Gabriel Agreste / Hawk Moth
 Sabrina Weisz as Nathalie Sancoeur
 Carrie Keranen as Alya Césaire / Rena Rouge
 Zeno Robinson as Nino Lahiffe / Carapace
 Selah Victor as Chloé Bourgeois / Queen Bee
 Christopher Corey Smith as Tom Dupain

Production
The film was first announced by Jeremy Zag during the Miraculous panel at the ComiKon İstanbul on September 29, 2018. The film was originally set to be released in 2021. On December 5, 2018, Zag confirmed that its plot will be a mix between an origin story and the television series storyline. Finishing the fourth and fifth seasons of the series before the movie was a priority for the studio. The following day, during a panel at Comic Con Experience 2018, Zag revealed that the film will be a musical and feature music composed by himself.

On May 16, 2019, during Cannes Film Festival, it was confirmed that the movie will be titled Ladybug & Cat Noir Awakening. It was revealed that production of the movie was underway and that the film is billed as a romantic fantasy adventure. Michael Gracey, the director of The Greatest Showman, has also been confirmed to be working on the film. 

On October 5, 2019, a short animated tease featuring Ladybug was put up on Zag's Instagram. Zag revealed some aspects of the film on January 8, 2020. On February 12, 2020, it was announced that Fantawild was one of the studios helping create and animate the film.

Around late March 2021, the very first book adaptation of the movie for young readers was announced with the release date being on November 2, 2021. The book's title is "Miraculous Movie: Movie Leveled Reader (Passport to Reading Level 2)". On May 10, 2021, a Toybook article revealed that the movie will be having a "fall release". On June 18, 2021, Annecy revealed that the film will be release in France on the first half of 2022. On March 16, 2022, Jeremy Zag revealed that the editing of the movie is completed. On June 1, 2022, Ezra Weisz announced that he will voice an unknown character in the movie. On June 25, 2022, Suhoon Kim revealed that the movie will be 105 minutes long.

During the Licensing Russia 2022, a poster of the film reveals Despicable Me character designer Carter Goodwich to be invovled in the character deisgn of the film while the film is being written by Bettina Lopez Mendoza from The Greatest Showman. Michael Gracey was later promoted to executive producer on the film with a July 2023 release much later in French.

Release
The film was previously set for a late 2021 release in France, according to Le Figaro. On June 18, 2021, at the Annecy Festival, it was revealed that the film was moved to the first half of 2022. Ladybug & Cat Noir Awakening was originally set to be released theatrically in France on August 3, 2022 by SND, but was later delayed to July 5, 2023.

References

External links

 

2023 films
2023 3D films
2023 drama films
2023 fantasy films
2023 romance films
2023 adventure films
2023 computer-animated films
2020s French animated films
2020s children's adventure films
2020s children's drama films
2020s children's fantasy films
2020s children's animated films
2020s teen drama films
2020s teen fantasy films
2020s teen romance films
2020s English-language films
2020s French-language films
French 3D films
French computer-animated films
French children's adventure films
French animated fantasy films
French drama films
French musical films
French romance films
French superhero films
French teen films
Teen adventure films
Teen drama films
Teen fantasy films
Teen musical films
Teen romance films
Animated adventure films
Animated drama films
Animated musical films
Animated romance films
Animated teen superhero films
Anime-influenced Western animation
Miraculous: Tales of Ladybug & Cat Noir
3D animated films
English-language French films
Animated films based on animated television series
Animated films about revenge
Animated films set in Paris
Films set in 2023
Films postponed due to the COVID-19 pandemic
Films impacted by the COVID-19 pandemic
Method Animation films